Clanculus kinzelbachi is a species of sea snail, a marine gastropod mollusk in the family Trochidae, the top snails.

Distribution
This marine species occurs in the Mediterranean Sea off Greece

References

kinzelbachi
Gastropods described in 1982